Garrett Putnam Serviss, Jr. (January 1881 – December 23, 1907) was an American athlete who mostly competed in the high jump. He competed for the United States in the 1904 Summer Olympics held in St Louis, United States in the high jump where he won the silver medal. Serviss graduated from Cornell University in 1905. His father was science fiction writer Garrett P. Serviss.

References

External links
Garrett Serviss' profile at database Olympics

1881 births
1907 deaths
Cornell University alumni
Olympic silver medalists for the United States in track and field
Athletes (track and field) at the 1904 Summer Olympics
American male high jumpers
Medalists at the 1904 Summer Olympics
Olympic male high jumpers